Joachim Schoonmaker Farm, also known as Saunderskill Farm, is a historic home and farm and national historic district located at Accord, Ulster County, New York. The farmstead was established about 300 years ago and owned by the same family since then. It includes a two-story, five bay, brick fronted stone house built in 1787, and with two rear frame wings. It has a side gable roof and interior gable end chimneys. Also on the property are the contributing stone smokehouse, -story wagon house, wood frame smokehouse, granary, barn (c. 1870, 1929), power house (c. 1900), two poultry houses, a section of the Delaware and Hudson Canal (1828), a two-story wood-frame house (1929), and a -story tenant house.

It was listed on the National Register of Historic Places in 2013.

References

Historic districts on the National Register of Historic Places in New York (state)
Farms on the National Register of Historic Places in New York (state)
1710 establishments in the Province of New York
Houses completed in 1787
Houses in Ulster County, New York
National Register of Historic Places in Ulster County, New York